Frederic Columbus Blake was an American engineer, social scientist, academic, futurist, writer, and visionary. He was adviser of numerous outstanding scientists in Ohio State University including William Littell Everitt. His PhD adviser was Ernest Fox Nichols, a President of Dartmouth College.

Notes 

American engineers
Year of birth missing
Year of death missing